I Rep That West is the first single by American rapper Ice Cube from his ninth album, I Am the West.

Live Performances

Ice Cube has performed the single several times, particularly on the  Lopez Tonight and Jimmy Kimmel Live! shows.

Music video

Directed by Gabriel Hart, the video was shot in Santa Monica, and several places in Los Angeles including Memorial Coliseum and at the Hollywood Sign. Ice Cube goes back in time in the Wild, Wild West times. The video features Ice Cube driving a Lowrider, while his sons Doughboy, O'Shea Jackson Jr., and WC make cameo appearances. The video has had over 10 million YouTube views.

Lil Wayne reference
In the line "Niggas around the world that think they wanna bang, don't get your ass caught up like Lil Wayne", Ice Cube is referring to Wayne's alleged confrontation by rapper (and rival Crip gang member) 40 Glocc.

2010 songs
Ice Cube songs
Music videos directed by Gabriel Hart
Songs written by Ice Cube